Blanka Kumbárová (born 22 June 1976) is a Czech former professional tennis player.

Kumbárová featured as a lucky loser at the 1998 Polish Open, which was her only WTA Tour main-draw appearance.

ITF finals

Singles (1–2)

Doubles (13–9)

References

External links
 
 

1976 births
Living people
Czech female tennis players
20th-century Czech women